Amporoforo is a rural commune in the district of Toamasina II (district), in the region of Atsinanana, on the east coast of Madagascar.
It is situated 50 km north-west of Toamasina.

Economy
The economy is based on agriculture. Rice, manioc & corn are grown, other crops are lychee, cloves, cacao, coffee, papaya, banana and sugar cane.

References

Populated places in Atsinanana